Shadow enhancers are groups of two or more enhancers that control the same target gene and drive overlapping spatiotemporal expression patterns. Shadow enhancers are found in a wide range of organisms, from insects to plants to mammals, particularly in association with developmental genes. While seemingly redundant, the individual enhancers of a shadow enhancer group have been shown to be critical for proper gene expression in the face of both environmental and genetic perturbations. Such perturbations may exacerbate fluctuations in upstream regulators.

References 

Gene expression